Åke Call (born 17 January 1942) is a Swedish sports shooter. He competed in the mixed skeet event at the 1976 Summer Olympics.

References

External links
 

1942 births
Living people
Swedish male sport shooters
Olympic shooters of Sweden
Shooters at the 1976 Summer Olympics
People from Motala Municipality
Sportspeople from Östergötland County